Hephaestus is the name of a fictional character appearing in American comic books published by DC Comics. He is adapted from the Greek god of the same name. Hephaestus first appeared in Wonder Woman #226.

Fictional character biography
Hephaestus is the Olympian Gods' blacksmith whose history is the same as his Greek mythology counterpart where he was born to Zeus and Hera and wed to Aphrodite. In the Pre-Crisis stories, he once assisted Ares in menacing Wonder Woman and singer Julie Gabriel with female robots and fire that feeds off emotion.

In the Post-Crisis, Hephaestus was the one who forged Wonder Woman's golden Lasso of Truth from the Golden Girdle of Gaea and her silver bracelets which he formed from the splintered Aegis of Zeus.

In 2011, The New 52 rebooted DC's continuity. While Hephaestus is shown to be deformed, his history of creating the Lasso of Truth is still intact. Wonder Woman is taken to Hephaestus by Eros. A molten monster sent by Hades kills two of Hephaestus' laborers and grabs Hephaestus. Wonder Woman uses water to put out the molten monster and shatters it. Afterwards, Wonder Woman discovers that the laborers are not automatons and actually men. Hephaestus and Eros state that the laborers were discarded male children from Themyscira that Hephaestus took in. He cut a deal with the Amazon to donate the male babies in exchange for giving them weapons. Later that night, Wonder Woman tried to get Hephaestus to release the males only for them to show their loyalty to him by demanding that Hephaestus be freed. She does so as Hephaestus states that Wonder Woman should get some sleep as she goes into the Underworld tomorrow. Hephaestus provides Wonder Woman with the equipment needed to rescue Zola from Hades where he even gives her Eros' guns. Hephaestus receives a wedding invitation from Hades after he used Eros' guns on Wonder Woman. Hermes and Zola were later seen walking through the woods when they are approached by Aphrodite. When Hermes states to Zola that Aphrodite is married to the ugly god Hephaestus, Aphrodite states that Hephaestus has other "charms" and also states that she will not be attending the wedding as there is little love in Hell.

Powers and abilities
Like the Olympian Gods, Hephastus has supernatural abilities that include size-changing, shapeshifting, and immortality. He also has genius-level intellect and is an expert blacksmith.

In other media
Hephaestus appears in the Justice League Unlimited episode "Hawk and Dove", voiced by Edward Asner. This version originally created Wonder Woman's armor for her mother Hippolyta, though he claims the latter did not have the right build. He is commissioned by Ares to build the "Annihilator", a living suit of armor fueled by violence, so the latter can use it to incite conflict in Kasnia. After recognizing Hephaestus' sigil on the armor, Wonder Woman confronts him. He refuses to talk, but hints at the Annihilator's inability to attack unless it is attacked.

References

External links
 Hephaestus at DC Comics Wiki

Hephaestus
Comics characters introduced in 1976
DC Comics deities
DC Comics male characters
Fictional characters who can change size
Fictional gods
Classical mythology in DC Comics
DC Comics characters who are shapeshifters
DC Comics characters who use magic
DC Comics characters with superhuman strength
Greek and Roman deities in fiction
Fictional smiths